Josefin Abrahamsson (born 4 October 1979) is a Swedish table tennis player in the disabled sport-movement. She became world champion in South Korea in 2006. She has also medaled in two Paralympic Games. She won a silver medal in Beijing in 2008 and a bronze medal in London in 2012.

References 
http://www.sydsvenskan.se/sport/josefin-abrahamsson/
https://archive.today/20130418103240/http://www.handikappidrott.se/templates/PresentationPage.aspx?id=8436

1979 births
Swedish female table tennis players
Table tennis players at the 2008 Summer Paralympics
Table tennis players at the 2012 Summer Paralympics
Paralympic table tennis players of Sweden
Medalists at the 2008 Summer Paralympics
Medalists at the 2012 Summer Paralympics
Paralympic medalists in table tennis
Paralympic silver medalists for Sweden
Paralympic bronze medalists for Sweden
Living people
Place of birth missing (living people)
21st-century Swedish women